In mathematics, especially in algebraic geometry and the theory of complex manifolds, coherent sheaves are a class of sheaves closely linked to the geometric properties of the underlying space. The definition of coherent sheaves is made with reference to a sheaf of rings that codifies this geometric information.

Coherent sheaves can be seen as a generalization of vector bundles. Unlike vector bundles, they form an abelian category, and so they are closed under operations such as taking kernels, images, and cokernels. The  quasi-coherent sheaves are a generalization of coherent sheaves and include the locally free sheaves of infinite rank.

Coherent sheaf cohomology is a powerful technique, in particular for studying the sections of a given coherent sheaf.

Definitions 
A quasi-coherent sheaf on a ringed space  is a sheaf  of -modules which has a local presentation, that is, every point in  has an open neighborhood  in which there is an exact sequence

A coherent sheaf on a ringed space  is a sheaf  satisfying the following two properties:

Morphisms between (quasi-)coherent sheaves are the same as morphisms of sheaves of -modules.

The case of schemes 

When  is a scheme, the general definitions above are equivalent to more explicit ones.

On an affine scheme , there is an equivalence of categories from -modules to quasi-coherent sheaves, taking a module  to the associated sheaf .

Here are several further characterizations of quasi-coherent sheaves on a scheme.

Properties 
On an arbitrary ringed space quasi-coherent sheaves do not necessarily form an abelian category. On the other hand, the quasi-coherent sheaves on any scheme form an abelian category, and they are extremely useful in that context.

On any ringed space , the coherent sheaves form an abelian category, a full subcategory of the category of -modules. (Analogously, the category of coherent modules over any ring  is a full abelian subcategory of the category of all -modules.) So the kernel, image, and cokernel of any map of coherent sheaves are coherent. The direct sum of two coherent sheaves is coherent; more generally, an -module that is an extension of two coherent sheaves is coherent.

A submodule of a coherent sheaf is coherent if it is of finite type.

The sheaf of rings  is called coherent if it is coherent considered as a sheaf of modules over itself. In particular, the Oka coherence theorem states that the sheaf of holomorphic functions on a complex analytic space  is a coherent sheaf of rings. The main part of the proof is the case . Likewise, on a locally Noetherian scheme , the structure sheaf  is a coherent sheaf of rings.

Basic constructions of coherent sheaves
(The analogous equivalence also holds for complex analytic spaces.) The sheaf-theoretic interpretation of vector bundles has the advantage that vector bundles (on a locally Noetherian scheme) are included in the abelian category of coherent sheaves.

Locally free sheaves come equipped with the standard -module operations, but these give back locally free sheaves.

Let ,  a Noetherian ring.

Let ,  a Noetherian -graded ring, be a projective scheme over a Noetherian ring .

In particular,  is called the tautological line bundle on the projective -space.

this is because  restricted to the vanishing locus of the two polynomials has two-dimensional fibers, and has one-dimensional fibers elsewhere.

Likewise, if  is a closed analytic subspace of a complex analytic space , the ideal sheaf  is coherent.

To be precise, this is the direct image sheaf , where  is the inclusion. Likewise for a closed analytic subspace of a complex analytic space. There is a short exact sequence of coherent sheaves on :

Most operations of linear algebra preserve coherent sheaves.

A simple non-example of a quasi-coherent sheaf is given by the extension by zero functor. For example, consider  for

Since this sheaf has non-trivial stalks, but zero global sections, this cannot be a quasi-coherent sheaf. This is because quasi-coherent sheaves on an affine scheme are equivalent to the category of modules over the underlying ring, and the adjunction comes from taking global sections.

Functoriality
Let  be a morphism of ringed spaces (for example, a morphism of schemes). An important special case is the pullback of a vector bundle, which is a vector bundle.

The direct image of a coherent sheaf is often not coherent. On the other hand, the direct image of a coherent sheaf under a proper morphism is coherent, by results of Grauert and Grothendieck.

Local behavior of coherent sheaves
A related fact is that the dimension of the fibers of a coherent sheaf is upper-semicontinuous. Thus a coherent sheaf has constant rank on an open set, while the rank can jump up on a lower-dimensional closed subset.

On a general scheme, one cannot determine whether a coherent sheaf is a vector bundle just from its fibers (as opposed to its stalks). On a reduced locally Noetherian scheme, however, a coherent sheaf is a vector bundle if and only if its rank is locally constant.

Examples of vector bundles

Then the tangent bundle  is defined to be the dual bundle .

For example, a section of the canonical bundle of affine space  over 
can be written as

Let  be a commutative ring and  a natural number. To define this, consider the morphism of -schemes

(That is, thinking of projective space as the space of 1-dimensional linear subspaces of affine space, send a nonzero point in affine space to the line that it spans.)

as regular functions on (.

Note that every closed subscheme of projective space can be defined as the zero set of some collection of homogeneous polynomials, hence as the zero set of some sections of the line bundles . This contrasts with the simpler case of affine space, where a closed subscheme is simply the zero set of some collection of regular functions.

Serre gave an algebraic description of all coherent sheaves on projective space, more subtle than what happens for affine space. Namely, let  be a Noetherian ring (for example, a field), and consider the polynomial ring  as a graded ring with each  having degree 1. Every coherent sheaf on  arises in this way from a finitely generated graded -module .

The tangent bundle of projective space  over a field  can be described in terms of the line bundle . Namely, there is a short exact sequence, the Euler sequence:

This is a fundamental calculation for algebraic geometry. For example, the fact that the canonical bundle is a negative multiple of the ample line bundle  means that projective space is a Fano variety. Over the complex numbers, this means that projective space has a Kähler metric with positive Ricci curvature.

Vector bundles on a hypersurface 
Consider a smooth degree- hypersurface  defined by the homogeneous polynomial  of degree . Then, there is an exact sequence

where the second map is the pullback of differential forms, and the first map sends

Dualizing this yields the exact sequence

If we use the fact that given an exact sequence

of vector bundles with ranks ,,, there is an isomorphism

of line bundles, then we see that there is the isomorphism

showing that

Serre construction and vector bundles 
This is given by a cohomological condition on the line bundle  (see below).

The correspondence in one direction is given as follows: for a section  we can associated the vanishing locus . If  is a codimension 2 subvariety, then

 It is a local complete intersection, meaning if we take an affine chart  then  can be represented as a function , where  and 
 The line bundle  is isomorphic to the canonical bundle  on 

In the other direction, for a codimension 2 subvariety  and a line bundle  such that

 
 

there is a canonical isomorphismwhich is functorial with respect to inclusion of codimension  subvarieties. Moreover, any isomorphism given on the left corresponds to a locally free sheaf in the middle of the extension on the right. This forms the basis for studying moduli of stable vector bundles in many specific cases, such as on principally polarized abelian varieties and K3 surfaces.

Chern classes and algebraic K-theory
These satisfy the same formal properties as Chern classes in topology. For example, for any short exact sequence

Although  is hard to compute in general, algebraic K-theory provides many tools for studying it, including a sequence of related groups  for integers .

(In topological terms, G-theory has the formal properties of a Borel–Moore homology theory for schemes, while K-theory is the corresponding cohomology theory.) The natural homomorphism  is an isomorphism if  is a regular separated Noetherian scheme, using that every coherent sheaf has a finite resolution by vector bundles in that case. For example, that gives a definition of the Chern classes of a coherent sheaf on a smooth variety over a field.

For example, every quasi-projective scheme over a Noetherian ring has the resolution property.

Applications of resolution property 
Since the resolution property states that a coherent sheaf  on a Noetherian scheme is quasi-isomorphic in the derived category to the complex of vector bundles :

If we take the projective scheme  associated to the ideal , then

since there is the resolution

Bundle homomorphism vs. sheaf homomorphism 
When vector bundles and locally free sheaves of finite constant rank are used interchangeably,
care must be given to distinguish between bundle homomorphisms and sheaf homomorphisms. Thus, it induces the sheaf homomorphism  of constant rank between the corresponding locally free -modules (sheaves of dual sections). But there may be an -module homomorphism that does not arise this way; namely, those not having constant rank.

In particular, a subbundle  is a subsheaf (i.e.,  is a subsheaf of ).

The category of quasi-coherent sheaves
The quasi-coherent sheaves on any fixed scheme form an abelian category. Gabber showed that, in fact, the quasi-coherent sheaves on any scheme form a particularly well-behaved abelian category, a Grothendieck category.

Coherent cohomology

The fundamental technical tool in algebraic geometry is the cohomology theory of coherent sheaves. Although it was introduced only in the 1950s, many earlier techniques of algebraic geometry are clarified by the language of sheaf cohomology applied to coherent sheaves. Broadly speaking, coherent sheaf cohomology can be viewed as a tool for producing functions with specified properties; sections of line bundles or of more general sheaves can be viewed as generalized functions. In complex analytic geometry, coherent sheaf cohomology also plays a foundational role.

Among the core results of coherent sheaf cohomology are results on finite-dimensionality of cohomology, results on the vanishing of cohomology in various cases, duality theorems such as Serre duality, relations between topology and algebraic geometry such as Hodge theory, and formulas for Euler characteristics of coherent sheaves such as the Riemann–Roch theorem.

See also
 Picard group
 Divisor (algebraic geometry)
 Reflexive sheaf
 Quot scheme
 Twisted sheaf
 Essentially finite vector bundle
 Bundle of principal parts
 Gabriel–Rosenberg reconstruction theorem
 Pseudo-coherent sheaf
 Quasi-coherent sheaf on an algebraic stack

Notes

References

 
Sections 0.5.3 and 0.5.4 of

External links

Part V of 

Algebraic geometry
Sheaf theory
Vector bundles
Topological methods of algebraic geometry
Complex manifolds